List of mayors in every locality of Malta from 1993, when the election of local councils was introduced.

Ħ'Attard

Motto: Florigera rosis halo

Henry Frendo (1994–1998)
Norbert Pace (1998–2008)
John Bonnici (2008–2012)
Stefan Cordina (2012– )

Ħal Balzan

Motto: Hortibus undique septa

Joseph Stellini (1993–1996)
Marselle Delicata (1996–1999)
John Zammit Montebello (1999–2015)
Ian Spiteri (2015–2021)
Angelo Micallef (2021- )

Il-Birgu Città Vittoriosa

Motto: Vicit Urbe

John Boxall (1994–1995)
Joseph C. Azzopardi (1995–1998)
John Boxall (1998– )

Birkirkara

Motto: In hoc signo vinces

Michael Asciak (1994–1994)
George Debattista (1994-1997)
Michael Asciak (1997-1998)
Tonio Fenech (1998–2003)
Doris Borg (2003–2006)
Michael Fenech Adami (2006–2013)
Joanne Debono Grech (2013– )

Birżebbuġa

Motto: Pax Salus Que Omnibus

Joseph Farrugia (1994–2015)
Kevin Barun (2015–2016)
Joseph Cutajar (2016-2019)
Joseph Farrugia (2019-2021)
Scott Camilleri (2021-)

Bormla Città  Cospicua

Motto: Ingens Amplectitur Agger

Joseph Carbonaro (1994–2000)
Paul Muscat (2000–2003)
Joseph Scerri (2003–2013)
Alison Zerafa Civelli (2013–2022)
Marco Emmanuel Agius (2022- )

Ħad-Dingli

Motto: Non Segnis Quies Ruris

Angelo Azzopardi (1994–1999)
Joseph Mary Abela (1999–2005)
Ian Borg (2005–2013)
Venera Micallef (2013–2015)
Sandro Azzopardi (2015–2019)
Raymond Schembri (2019- )

Il-Fgura

Anthony Degiovanni (1994–1997)
Saviour Camilleri (1997–2000)
Anthony Degiovanni (2000–2004)
Darren Marmarà (2004–2010)
Byron Camilleri (2010–2017)
Pierre Dalli (2017-)

Il-Furjana Borgo Vilhena

Motto: Flores mulcent aurae educat imber

Publio Agius (1994–1998)
Nigel Holland (1998–2004)
John Mary Brincat (2004–2004)
Publio Agius (2004–2007)
Nigel Holland (2007–2012)
Davina Sammut(2012–2012)
Nigel Holland (2012–2015)
Davina Sammut (2015–2022)
Vincent Borg (2022- )

Il-Fontana (It-Triq tal-Għajn)

Motto: Indundatione Ferax

Anthony Borg (1993–1996)
Saviour Borg (1996–2002)
Valentino Cassar (2002–2005)
Saviour Borg (2005–)

Għajnsielem

Motto: Ob Fontem Prosperitas

Francis Cauchi (1994–2015)
Franco Ciangura (2015–2019)
Kevin Cauchi (2019–)

L-Għarb

Motto: In Extremo Vigilat

Louis Apap (1994–1995)
Maurice Cauchi (1995-1996)
Alfred Cauchi (1996–1997)
David Apap (1997– )

Ħal Għargħur

Motto: Excelsior

Mario Gauci (1994–2015)
Ġiljan Aquilina (2015–2019)
Abraham Aquilina (2019- )

L-Għasri

Motto: Ex Labore Fructus

Rita Cutajar (1993–1996)
Emanuel Mintoff (1996–1999)
Carmen Grech (1999–2002)
Andrew Vella (2002–2013)
Daniel Attard (2013– )

Ħal Għaxaq

Motto: Laeta Sustineo

Joseph Mary Abdilla (1994–2006)
Emanuel Vassallo (2006–2013)
Darren Abela (2013– )

Il-Gudja

Motto: Pluribus Parens

Angelo Agius (1994–1997)
Mario Calleja (1997– 2019)
Marija Sara Vella (2019-)

Il-Gżira

Motto: Recte Floreat

Albert Rizzo (1994–1998)
Ian Micallef (1998–2001)
Anthony Buhagiar (2001–2004)
Albert Rizzo (2004–2007)
Christian Paul Bonnet (2007–2012)
Roberto Christiano (2012–2015)
Conrad Borg Manché (2015–)

Il-Ħamrun

Motto: Propera Augesco

Peter Attard (1994–1998)
Joseph M. Zammit Cordina (1998–2001)
Luciano Busuttil (2001–2012)
Vincent Bonello (2012–2015)
Christian Sammut (2015–)

L-Iklin

Joseph Buttigieg (1994–1996)
Anthony Dalli (1996–2019)
Dorian Sciberras (2019- )

L-Isla (Senglea) (Città Invicta)

Stephen Perici (1994–1997)
Louis Henwood (1997–1999)
Joseph Casha (1999–2012)
Justin John Camilleri (2012–2015)
Joseph Casha (2015–2019)
Clive Pulis (2019- )

Il-Kalkara

Motto: A Calce Nomen

Michael Zarb (1994–2000)
Michael Cohen (2000–2013)
Speranza Chircop (2013–2019)
Wayne Aquilina (2019- )

Ta' Kerċem

Motto: Flectar non Frangar

Paul Gauci       (July 1994-June 2000)
Alfred Stellini  (July 2000-March 2001)
Joseph Grima     (April 2001-March 2012)
Mario Azzopardi  (April 2012 –   )

Ħal Kirkop

Motto: Parva non Iners

Michael Baldacchino (1994–1996)
Joseph Busuttil (1996–1999)
Charles Mansueto (1999–2002)
Mario Salerno (2002–2012)
Carmel Calleja (2012–2015)
Terence Agius (2015–)

Ħal Lija

Motto: Suave Fructu Rubeo

Joseph Mary Mangion (1994–1997)
Magdalen Magri Naudi (1997–2000)
Joseph Mary Mangion (2000–2003)
Mary Magdalen Magri (2003–2006)
Ian Castaldi Paris (2006–2014)
Mary Magdalen Magri (2014–2019)
Anthony Dalli (2019- )

Ħal Luqa

Motto: Oras Prospicio

Michael Cachia (1994–2001)
John Schembri (2001–    )

Il-Marsa

Motto: Portu Novu

Francis Debono (1994–1997)
Frank Zammit (1997–1999)
Francis Debono (1999–2012)
Christopher Spiteri (2012)
Francis Debono (2012-2019)
Josef Azzopardi (2019-)

Marsaskala (Wied il-Għajn)

Motto: Għajn ta' Kenn u Mistrieħ

Marvic Attard Gialanze (1994–1997)
Charlie Zammit (1997–2000)
Carmelo Mifsud (2000–2006)
Mario Calleja (2006–    )

Marsaxlokk

Motto: Portus Herculis

Paul Sciriha (1994–1998)
Carmelo Bugeja (1998–2004)
Edric Micallef (2004–2007)
Stephen Caruana (2007–2012)
Edric Micallef (2012–2015)
Horace Gauci (2015–2019)
Steven Grech (2019- )

L-Imdina Città Notabile

George Attard (1994–2000)
Mario Galea Testaferrata (2000–2003)
Peter Dei Conti Sant Manduca (2003–   )

Il-Mellieħa

Motto: Ex Sale Et Melle Nomen Meum

Joe Borg (1993–1996)
Sammy Vella (1996–1999)
Joe Borg (1999–2002)
John Francis Buttigieg (2002–2008)
Robert Cutajar (2008–2013)
John Francis Buttigieg (2013–2017 )
Dario Vella (2017–)

L-Imġarr

Motto: Żgħir b'Qalb Kbira

Victor Camilleri (1994–2000)
Paul Vella (2000– )

Il-Mosta

Motto: Spes Alit Ruricolam

Nazzareno Vassallo (1994–1998)
Joseph P. Demartino (1998–2007)
Paul Chetcuti Caruana (2007–2012)
Shirley Farrugia (2012–2015)
Edwin Vassallo (2015–2016)
Ivan Bartolo (2016–2017)
Keith Cassar (2017–2019)
Romilda Baldacchino Zarb (2019–2022)
Chris Grech (2022- )

L-Imqabba

Motto: Non Nisi Per Ardua

Emanuel Buttigieg (1994–2004)
Noel Galea (2004–2005)
Nicholas Briffa (2005–2008)
Emmanuel Galea (2008–2013)
Nicholas Briffa (2013–2015)
Charlene Zammit (2015–2019)
Omar Farrugia (2019-2022)
Grace Marie Zerafa (2022- )

L-Imsida

Motto: Novissima Surgo

Joseph Cassar Naudi (1994–1997)
Carmel Grima (1997–2006)
Alexander Sciberras (2006–2009)
Clifton Grima (2009 – 2013)
Margaret Baldacchino Cefai (2013 –)

L-Imtarfa

Josephine Abela (2000–2004)
John Camilleri (2004–2006)
Josephine Abela (2006–2008)
Anton Mifsud (2008–2013)
Daniel John Attard (2013–)

Il-Munxar

Motto: Parvulus Sed Munitus

Joseph Debrincat (1994–1998)
Paul Curmi (1998–2001)
Joseph Sultana (2001–2015)
Carmen Said (2015–2019)
Damien Christ Spiteri (2019-)

In-Nadur

Motto: Vigilant

Joseph Tabone (1993–1996)
Eucharist Camilleri (1996–1999)
Chris Said (1999–2008)
Miriam Portelli (2008–2012)
Charles Said (2012–2015)
Edward Said (2015–)

In-Naxxar

Motto: Prior Credidi

Angelo Xuereb (1994–2000)
Maria Fatima Deguara (2000–2017)
Ann-Marie Muscat Fenech Adami (2017-)

Raħal Ġdid (Paola) Casal Nouvo / Casal Paola

Silvio Parnis (1994–1996)
Ino Bonello   (1996–1999)
Raymond Attard(1999–2007)
Dominic Grima (2007–2012)
Roderick Spiteri (2012–2015)
Dominic Grima (2015–)

Pembroke

Motto: Għal Kull Bżonn

Joseph Demicoli (1994–1996)
Gino Cauchi (1996–1999)
Joseph Zammit (1999–2013)
Dean Hili (2013– )

Tal-Pietà

Malcolm Mifsud (1994–2006)
Santo Attard (2006–2013)
Keith John Tanti (2013–2022)
Zoya Attard (2022- )

Il-Qala

Motto: In Tempestate Perfugium

Paul Buttigieg (1994–2012)
Clint Camilleri (2012–2017)
Paul Buttigieg (2017-)

Ħal Qormi Città Pinto

Motto: Altior ab Imo

George Portelli (1994–1998)
Clyde Puli (1998–2001)
Roderick Galdes (2001–2004)
Jesmond Aquilina (2004–2012)
Rosianne Cutajar (2012–2017)
Jesmond Aquilina (2017-2019)
Renald Falzon (2019-2020)
Josef Masini Vento (2020- )

Il-Qrendi

Motto: Tyrium Dirutas Servo Moles

Nicholas Aquilina (1993–1996)
Daniel Farrugia (1996–1999)
Carmel Falzon (1999–2013)
David Michael Schembri (2013– )

Ir-Rabat, Għawdex Città Victoria

Motto: A Magna Maxima

Victor Galea Pace (1994–1996)
Joseph Dimech (1996–1997)
Paul Galea (1997–2000)
Paul M. Cassar (2000–2003)
Vivienne Mary Galea Pace (2003–2006)
Robert Tabone (2006–2009)
Samuel Azzopardi (2009–2019)
Josef Schembri (2019-)

Ir-Rabat

Motto: Ħaġra Prezzjuża Magħrufa Bħala Tleqq

Alfred Sharples (1994–2000)
Rudolph Grima (2000–2003)
Charles Azzopardi (2003–2006)
Francis Fabri (2006–2007)
Alexander (Sandro) Craus  (2007–2013)
Charles Azzopardi (2013–2019)
Alexander(Sandro) Craus (2019- )

Ħal Safi

Motto: Sine Macula

Peter Paul Busuttil (1994–2012)
Francis Callus (2012–2015)
Johan Mula (2015–)

San Ġiljan

Motto: Litoris Aquas Sinuato Margine Cingo

Charles Sciberras (1994–1996)
Peter Bonello (1996–2015)
Karl Gouder (2015–2016)
Guido Dalli (2016-2019)
Albert Buttigieg (2019-)

San Ġwann

Antoine Cesareo (1994–2000)
Helen Fenech (2000–2003)
Kurt Guillaumier (2003–2006)
Joe Borg (2006–2008)
Rene` Savona Ventura (2008-2010)
Joseph Agius (2010 - 2012)
Etienne Bonello Depuis (2012–2019)
Trevor Fenech (2019-)

San Lawrenz

Motto: Dominus Protectio Mea

Noel Formosa (1994–2012)
Anthony Formosa (2012–2015)
Noel Formosa (2015–)

San Pawl il-Baħar

Motto: In Christo Renati Sumus

Michael Gonzi (1993–1996)
Paul Bugeja (1996–2008)
Graziella Galea (2008–2012)
Salerno Mario (2012–2013)
Raymond Tabone (2013–2015)
Graziella Galea (2015–2018)
Anne Fenech (2018–2019)
Alfred Grima (2019–)

Ta' Sannat

Motto: Labor Ante Omnia

Francis Cassar (1994–1997)
Rose Anne Buttigieg (1996–1999)
Anthony Mercieca (1999–2002)
Carmel Camilleri (2002–2007)
Anthony Mercieca (2007–2009)
Philip Vella (2009– )

Santa Luċija

Frederick Cutajar (1994–2015)
Terrence Ellul (2015–2019)
Charmaine St.John (2019- )

Santa Venera

Motto: Virtus In Infirmitatate Per Fictur

Michael Caruana (1994–2005)
Stephen Sultana (2005–2008)
Elizabeth Vella (2008–2012)
Horace J. Anastasi (2012–2013)
Stephen Sultana (2013–)

Is-Siġġiewi Città Ferdinand

Motto: Labore et Virtute

Angelo Farrugia (1994–1998)
Nenu Aquilina (1998–2001)
Robert Musumeci (2001–2012)
Karol Aquilina (2012–2017)
Alessia Psaila Zammit (2017–2019)
Kurtsein Sant (2019–2020)
Dominic Grech (2020- )

Tas-Sliema

Motto: Celer ad Oras Surgo

Robert Arrigo (1994–2003)
Albert Bonello (2003–2006)
Marina Arrigo (2006–2009)
Nicky Dimech  (2009–)
Joanna Gonzi (–2012)
Anthony Chircop (2012–2022)
Graziella Attard Previ (2022-2022)
John Pillow (2022- )

Is-Swieqi

Motto: Reduci ad Pristinum Publicum Statum

Antoinette Naudi (1994–1998)
Dolores Cristina (1998–2001)
Paul Abela (2001–2004)
Anthony Barbaro Sant (2004–2007)
Carmen Said (2007–2012)
Noel Muscat (2012– )

Ħal Tarxien

Motto: Tyrii Genure Coloni

Anthony Busuttil (1994–1997)
Joseph Mercieca (1997–2000)
Paul Farrugia (2000–2013)
Joseph Abela (2013–2015)
Paul Farrugia (2015-2019)
Joseph Galea (2019–present)

Ta' Xbiex

Motto: Sole Illuminata Marique Amplecta

William A. Cassar Torregiani (1993–1999)
Antoinette Vassallo (1999–2013)
Maximilian Zammit (2013– )

Il-Belt Valletta Città Umillisima

Hector Bruno (1993–1999)
Paul Borg Olivier (1999–2008)
Alexiei Dingli (2008–2019)
Christian Micallef (2019–2019)
Alfred Zammit (2019– )

Ix-Xagħra

Motto: Librat Et Evolat

Mario Xerri (1994–1998)
Anthony Attard (1998–2004)
Joseph Spiteri (2004–2007)
Joseph Cordina (2007–2019)
Christian Joseph Zammit (2019- )

Ix-Xewkija

Motto: Nemo Me Impune Lacessit

Augustine Dingli (1994–1999)
Mario Emanuel Camilleri (1999–2002)
Monica Vella (2002–2013)
Paul Azzopardi (2013–2019)
Hubert Saliba (2019- )

Ix-Xgħajra

Francesco Saverio Minuti (1994–1997)
Anton Meilak (1997–2000)
Anthony Valvo (2000–2019)
Neil Attard (2019- )

Ħaż-Żabbar Città Hompesch

Thomas Farrell (1994–1995)
Renato Agius Muscat (1995–1997)
Felix Zarb (1997–1999, died in office)
Joe Fenech (1999–2000)
Domenic Agius (2000–2006)
Clyde Caruana (2006–2009)
Domenic Agius (2009–2013)
Quinton Scerri (2013–2014, resigned)
Marc Vella Bonnici (2014–2019)
Jorge Grech (2019– )

Iż-Żebbuġ, Gozo

Motto: Terra Sublimis

Michael Cefai (1994–1998)
Harry Debono (1998–2004)
Carmelo Saliba (2004–2012)
Nicky Saliba (2012–2021)
Marlene Cini (2021- )

Ħaż-Żebbuġ, Malta Città Rohan

Motto: Semper Virens

Godfrey Farrugia (1993–1999)
Paul Bonnici (1999–2001)
Dominic Zammit (2001–2002)
Joseph Ciantar (2002–2005)
Paula Vella Sciriha (2005– 2006)
Brian Bonnici (2006–2009)
Alfred Grixti (2009–2015)
Sarah Agius (2015–2019)
Malcolm Paul Galea (2019-2022)
Mark Camilleri (2022–)

Iż-Żejtun Città Beland

Motto: Palladis clara munera

Ronald Scicluna (1994–1996)
Joe Attard (1996–2017)
Maria Dolores Abela (2017-)

Iż-Żurrieq

Motto: Sic a Cyaneo Aequore

Salvu Saliba (1993–1996)
 Joe Cassar (1996–2002)
Ignatius Farrugia (2002–2008)
Silvio Izzi Savona (2008–2012)
Ignatius Farrugia (2012–2019)
Rita Grima (2019- )

Malta
Mayors
Mayors
 List